DXLB (104.9 FM), broadcasting as DX Lake Buluan 104.9, is a radio station owned and operated by the Community Media Education Council. Its studios and transmitter are located at Brgy. Poblacion Mopac, Buluan, Maguindanao. This serves as the community station for the Islam people in Buluan and southeastern Maguindanao.

References

Radio stations established in 2004
Islamic radio stations